Northeast Wrestling (NEW) is an independent professional wrestling promotion based in the Northeastern United States and has promoted events since 1996. It is currently owned and operated by promoter Mike Lombardi and is one of the top independent wrestling promotions in the Northeast.

Championships

Active Titles

Former Championships

Other accomplishments

NEW Tag Team Championship

Reigns

Combined reigns

By team

By wrestler

NEW Live Championship

Reigns

Alumni

 Abyss
 Adam Cole
 Adam Page
 Ahmed Johnson
 A.J. Styles
 Al Snow
 Angelina Love
 Awesome Kong
 Bam Bam Bigelow (former NEW Champion)
 Big Daddy V
 Billy Gunn
 Billy Kidman
 Bobby Lashley
 Booker T
 Brooke Carter
 Brother Devon (former NEW U.S. Champion)
 Brother Ray
 Bryan Danielson
 Carmelo Hayes (former NEW Live Champion)
 Cody (former NEW Champion)
 Flip Gordon (former NEW Champion)
 Jack Swagger (former NEW Champion)
 Kevin Nash
 Kurt Angle
 Mike Bennett (former NEW Champion)
 Super Nova (former NEW Junior Heavyweight Champion)
 Mike Quackenbush (former NEW Junior Heavyweight Champion)
 Paul London (former NEW Champion)
 Sycho Sid (former NEW Champion)
 Velvet Sky

References

External links
Northeast Wrestling (NEW)
NEW profile at Cagematch

American professional wrestling promotions
American independent professional wrestling promotions based in New York (state)
American companies established in 1996
National Wrestling Alliance members